Rambaa Somdet (born August 30, 1974) is a retired Thai mixed martial artist and former Muay Thai fighter who has fought for K-1, Shooto, DEEP and Palace Fighting Championship. He competed in the flyweight and strawweight divisions. Somdet is a former Shooto World Flyweight (114 lb) Champion. He is considered by many to be the greatest strawweight in mixed martial arts history.

Personal life
He has, since retiring, opened his own gym, the M-16 gym.

He is the nephew of the former Rajadamnern and WMC champion Tappaya Sit-Or and the cousin of the reigning Thailand and World Kickboxing Network Muaythai Welterweight world champion Sudsakorn Sor Klinmee. It was his uncle that first introduced him to Muay Thai.

Mixed martial arts career
Rambaa Somdet made his mixed martial arts debut against Takumi Yano in 2001 during Deep 3 Impact. He won a unanimous decision. His second and third fights with DEEP were against Mitsuhisa Sunabe and Darren Uyenoyama, both of which he lost by way of unanimous decision. Somdet would however leave the organization on a win, defeating Takeyasu Hirono.

He would then move to Shooto, when he faced Takehiro Harusaki during Shooto: Battle Mix Tokyo 4. He won in his debut with Shooto. In his second fight he faced Masaaki Sugawara, which he won by TKO. He was then set to fight Noboru Tahara, winning his third fight in a row. Briefly leaving Shooto he was scheduled to fight for the PFC flyweight title, but was forced to withdraw with injury. After recovering he faced Ulysses Gomez during PFC 11: All In. He won a unanimous decision.

Riding a five fight winning streak, he was given a chance to fight for the inaugural Shooto Flyweight Champion. Somdet defeated Noboru Tahara in a rematch to become the first Shooto Flyweight Champion (Shooto's Flyweight division is fought at 114 lbs.) on November 23, 2009 in Tokyo. He defended his title against Hiroyuki Abe. He was scheduled to defend his title against Junji Ito at "Shootor's Legacy 2" on March 12, 2011, however the bout has been pushed back to April 29, 2011.

On April 16, 2011, Shooto announced Somdet was vacating his title due to a partially torn left biceps.

Moving to GRABAKA he won a decision versus Takuya Eizumi. Following this win, he was signed by PXC. Is his first with PXC he faced Rabin Catalan. He won the fight with a rear naked choke, the first submission win of his career. Returning to GRABAKA he won a unanimous decision against Kenichi Sawada. His 11 fight winning streak was snapped at PXC 46, losing a close split decision to Cristiano Pitpitunge.

His last mixed martial arts fight came at Shooto - Torao 15, when he won a unanimous decision against Masayoshi Kato.

Championships and accomplishments
Shooto
Shooto World Flyweight (114 lb) Championship 
One successful title defense 
Undefeated in Shooto (6-0)
Fight Matrix
Strawweight lineal champion (One time, former)
Longest serving lineal champion (2007-2014)

Mixed martial arts record

|-
| Win
| align=center|13–3
| Masayoshi Kato
| Decision (unanimous)
| Shooto - Torao 15: Direction of the Cage
| 
| align=center| 3
| align=center| 5:00
| Tokyo, Japan
|
|-
| Loss
| align=center|12–3
| Cristiano Pitpitunge
| Decision (split)
| PXC 46
| 
| align=center| 3
| align=center| 5:00
| Manila, Philippines
|
|-
| Win
| align=center|12–2
| Kenichi Sawada
| Decision (unanimous)
| Grabaka Live! 3
| 
| align=center| 3
| align=center| 5:00
| Tokyo, Japan
|
|-
| Win
| align=center|11–2
| Robin Catalan
| Submission (rear-naked choke)
| PXC 38
| 
| align=center| 1
| align=center| 3:20
| Mangilao, Guam
|
|-
| Win
| align=center|10–2
| Takuya Eizumi
| Decision (unanimous)
| Grabaka Live 2	
| 
| align=center|2
| align=center|5:00
| Tokyo, Japan
|
|-
| Win
| align=center|9–2
| Ryota Uozumi
| Decision (unanimous)
| Grabaka Live - 1st Cage Attack 	
| 
| align=center|2
| align=center|5:00
| Tokyo, Japan
| 
|-
| Win
| align=center|8–2
| Hiroyuki Abe
| TKO (doctor stoppage)
| Shooto: The Way of Shooto 4: Like a Tiger, Like a Dragon	
| 
| align=center|1
| align=center|4:31
| Tokyo, Japan
| 
|-
| Win
| align=center|7–2
| Noboru Tahara
| Decision (unanimous)
| Shooto: Revolutionary Exchanges 3
| 
| align=center|3
| align=center|5:00
| Tokyo, Japan
| 
|-
| Win
| align=center|6–2
| Ulysses Gomez
| Decision (unanimous)
| PFC 11: All In
| 
| align=center|3
| align=center|3:00
| Lemoore, California, United States
| 
|-
| Win
| align=center|5–2
| Noboru Tahara
| Decision (unanimous)
| Shooto: Shooto Tradition 3
| 
| align=center|3
| align=center|5:00
| Tokyo, Japan
| 
|-
| Win
| align=center|4–2
| Masaaki Sugawara
| TKO (doctor stoppage)
| Shooto: Back To Our Roots 6
| 
| align=center|2
| align=center|5:00
| Tokyo, Japan
| 
|-
| Win
| align=center|3–2
| Takehiro Harusaki
| Decision (unanimous)
| Shooto: Battle Mix Tokyo 4
| 
| align=center|3
| align=center|5:00
| Tokyo, Japan
| 
|-
| Win
| align=center|2–2
| Takeyasu Hirono
| Decision (unanimous)
| Deep - 7th Impact
| 
| align=center|3
| align=center|5:00
| Tokyo, Japan
| 
|-
| Loss
| align=center|1–2
| Darren Uyenoyama
| Decision (unanimous)  	
| Deep - 5th Impact
| 
| align=center|3
| align=center|5:00
| Tokyo, Japan
| 
|-
| Loss
| align=center|1–1
| Mitsuhisa Sunabe
| Decision (majority)
| Deep - 4th Impact
| 
| align=center|3
| align=center|5:00
| Nagoya, Japan
| 
|-
| Win
| align=center|1–0
| Takumi Yano
| Decision (unanimous)  	
| Deep - 3rd Impact
| 
| align=center|3
| align=center|5:00
| Tokyo, Japan
|

Muay Thai record

|- bgcolor="#CCFFCC"
| 2001-11-11 || Win ||align=left| Khunchailek Chaoraiaoi || Omnoi Stadium || Samut Sakhon, Thailand || Decision || 5 ||3:00 
|- bgcolor="#CCFFCC"
| 2001-03-16 || Win ||align=left| Ken Yasukawa|| AJKF "CROSS FIRE-I" || Bunkyo, Tokyo, Japan || KO || 1 || 2:12
|- bgcolor="#CCFFCC"
| 2001-02-16 || Win ||align=left| Philipe de Silva || AJKF "Be Wild" || Bunkyo, Tokyo, Japan || KO (head kick) || 1 || 2:00
|- bgcolor="#CCFFCC"
| 2000-11-01 || Win ||align=left| Susumu Daiguji || K-1 J-MAX 2000 || Bunkyo, Tokyo, Japan || Decision (unanimous) || 5 || 3:00
|- bgcolor="#fbb"
| 2000-07-08 || Loss||align=left| Sueahuallek Chor Sophipong || Omnoi Stadium || Samut Sakhon, Thailand || Decision ||5 ||3:00 

|- bgcolor="#CCFFCC"
| 1999-08-07 || Win ||align=left| Lookdod Sor.Thammarangsri || Omnoi Stadium || Samut Sakhon, Thailand || KO (High kick) || 1 || 

|- bgcolor="#CCFFCC"
| 1999-05-14 || Win ||align=left| Genki Yamaguchi || MAJKF "The 2nd Kajiwara Ikki Cup'99 Kick Guts" || Bunkyo, Tokyo, Japan || Decision (unanimous) || 3 || 3:00
|- bgcolor="#CCFFCC"
| 1998-12-26 || Win ||align=left| Rabbit Seki || MAJKF || Bunkyo, Tokyo, Japan || KO (knees) || 1 || 2:46
|- bgcolor="#CCFFCC"
| 1998-11-14 || Win ||align=left| Joe Tsuchiya || "Ground Zero Tokyo" ||  || KO (right hook) || 1 || 2:59
|- bgcolor="#fbb"
| 1998-06-27 || Loss||align=left| Nichao Ptechsamai || Omnoi Stadium || Samut Sakhon, Thailand || Decision || 5 ||3:00 
|- bgcolor="#cfc"
| 1998- || Win||align=left| Houysailek Sor.Suwanpakdee|| Lumpinee Stadium || Bangkok, Thailand || Decision || 5 ||3:00 
|- bgcolor="#fbb"
| 1997-07-05 || Loss ||align=left| Chondan Technodusit || Omnoi Stadium || Samut Sakhon, Thailand || Decision || 5 ||3:00 
|- bgcolor="#fbb"
| 1997-02-01 || Loss ||align=left| Kamel Jemel ||  Le Choc Des Champions || Gagny, France || Decision || 5 ||3:00 
|- bgcolor="#cfc"
| 1995- || Win||align=left| Omar Moussadak ||  || Thailand || TKO (retirement)|| 3 || 
|-  style="background:#fbb;"
| ? || Loss ||align=left| Toto Por.Pongsawang || Omnoi Stadium || Thailand || KO (Left Elbow)|| 2||
|- bgcolor="#cfc"
| 1995-02-16 || Win||align=left| Chakphet Kiatchaiyong|| Omnoi Stadium || Samut Sakhon, Thailand || KO || 2 || 
|- bgcolor="#fbb"
| 1994-12-13 || Loss||align=left| Chiangrung Kor Narongsak ||  || Samut Songkhram, Thailand || Decision || 5 ||3:00 
|- bgcolor="#cfc"
| 1994-11-26 || Win||align=left| Chiangrung Kor.Narongsak|| Omnoi Stadium || Samut Sakhon, Thailand || Decision ||  5|| 3:00
|- bgcolor="#cfc"
| 1994-10- || Win||align=left| Yomio Hyundai|| || Chiang Rai, Thailand || Decision ||  5|| 3:00
|- bgcolor="#cfc"
| 1994-10- || Win||align=left| Kobayashi (YamagiGym)||  || Nongkhai, Thailand || KO (High kick)|| 3 ||
|- bgcolor="#cfc"
| 1994-09-30 || Win||align=left| Samandej Lookmongkwan || Lumpinee Stadium || Bangkok, Thailand || KO (Uppercuts)|| 2 || 
|- bgcolor="#cfc"
| 1994-09-06 || Win||align=left| Mondam Sor Nayai-Nam || Omnoi Stadium || Samut Sakhon, Thailand || KO (Uppercut)|| 1 ||0:29 
|- bgcolor="#cfc"
| 1994-08-20 || Win||align=left| Sakbanlue Sakcharuporn|| Omnoi Stadium || Samut Sakhon, Thailand || Decision ||  5|| 3:00
|- bgcolor="#cfc"
| 1994-08-05 || Win||align=left| Chakphet Kiatchaiyong|| Lumpinee Stadium || Bangkok, Thailand || KO (Punches)|| 2 || 
|- bgcolor="#c5d2ea"
| 1994-07-18 || Draw||align=left| Sakbanlue Sakcharuporn|| Lumpinee Stadium || Bangkok, Thailand || Decision ||  5|| 3:00
 |- bgcolor="#cfc"
| 1994-06- || Win||align=left| Samandej Lookmongkwan || Lumpinee Stadium || Bangkok, Thailand || KO || 2 || 
|- bgcolor="#cfc"
| 1994-05- || Win||align=left| Pichitchai Kiatpraphat || Omnoi Stadium || Samut Sakhon, Thailand || KO || 2 || 
|- bgcolor="#CCFFCC"
| 1994-04-13|| Win ||align=left| Jimmy || || Chiang Mai province, Thailand || Decision  || 5 || 3:00
|- bgcolor="#fbb"
| 1994-03-26 || Loss||align=left| Jompadet Singkiri || Omnoi Stadium || Samut Sakhon, Thailand || Decision || 5 ||3:00 
|- bgcolor="#cfc"
| 1994- || Win||align=left| Seua Or.Ukrit ||  Lumpinee Stadium || Bangkok, Thailand || Decision ||  5|| 3:00
|- bgcolor="#fbb"
| 1993-12-09 || Loss||align=left| Kompayak Sit Kru Od ||  || Chonburi, Thailand || Decision || 5 ||3:00 
|- bgcolor="#cfc"
| 1993-11-21 || Win||align=left| Thao Khammanoon||  || Vientiane, Laos || TKO || 2 || 
|- bgcolor="#fbb"
| 1993-10-09 || Loss||align=left| Jaruad Manwood || Omnoi Stadium || Samut Sakhon, Thailand || Decision || 5 ||3:00 
|- bgcolor="#CCFFCC"
| 1993-04-02 || Win ||align=left| Malaithong Sakthewan || Lumpinee Stadium || Bangkok, Thailand || Decision || 5 || 3:00
|- bgcolor="#fbb"
| 1993-03-05 || Loss||align=left| Malaithong Sakthewan || Omnoi Stadium || Samut Sakhon, Thailand || Decision || 5 || 3:00
|- bgcolor="#CCFFCC"
| 1993- || Win ||align=left| Aodnoi Galaxy || Omnoi Stadium || Samut Sakhon, Thailand || KO (Left Hook) || 5 || 
|-  style="background:#fbb;"
| 1992-12-08 || Loss ||align=left| Mondam Sor.Nayayarm || Lumpinee Stadium || Thailand || KO (Punches)|| 2||
|- bgcolor="#cfc"
| 1992-11-17 || Win||align=left| Jomtabnoi Sitkruod ||Lumpinee Stadium|| Bangkok, Thailand || Decision || 5 ||3:00 
|- bgcolor="#fbb"
| 1992-07-28|| Loss||align=left| Jomruthbek Rattanachot || Lumpinee Stadium || Bangkok, Thailand || Decision || 5 ||3:00 
|- bgcolor="#cfc"
| 1992-07-10 || Win||align=left| Sornsuriya Sor Badin ||Lumpinee Stadium|| Bangkok, Thailand || Decision || 5 ||3:00 
|- bgcolor="#cfc"
| 1992-05-26 || Win||align=left| Denthaksin Sor.Suwanpakdee || Lumpinee Stadium || Bangkok, Thailand || TKO (Punches) || || 
|- bgcolor="#CCFFCC"
| 1992-04-10 || Win ||align=left| Chalong Silpakorn || Lumpinee Stadium || Bangkok, Thailand || KO (High kick) || 3 || 
|- bgcolor="#CCFFCC"
| 1991-11-08 || Win ||align=left| Yodkaen Ploysakda|| Lumpinee Stadium || Bangkok, Thailand || KO  || 1 || 
|- bgcolor="#fbb"
| 1991-09-06|| Loss||align=left| Jomruthbek Rattanachot || Lumpinee Stadium || Bangkok, Thailand || Decision || 5 ||3:00 
|- bgcolor="#fbb"
| 1991-07- || Loss||align=left| Nungthoranee Pëtchyindee || Lumpinee Stadium || Bangkok, Thailand || Decision || 5 ||3:00 
|- bgcolor="#cfc"
| 1991-07-09 || Win||align=left| Wanlop Sitpayak || Lumpinee Stadium || Bangkok, Thailand || KO (Punches)|| 2 || 
|- bgcolor="#cfc"
| 1991-02-16 || Win||align=left| Chiangrung Kor.Narongsak || || Pattaya, Thailand || Decision || 5 ||3:00 
|- bgcolor="#fbb"
| 1991-01-28 || Loss||align=left| Chuchai Kiatchaning || Rajadamnern Stadium || Bangkok, Thailand ||KO (Uppercut)|| 1 || 
|- bgcolor=""
| 1990-12-31 || ||align=left| Chuchai Kiatchaning || Lumpinee Stadium || Bangkok, Thailand || ||  ||
|- bgcolor="#fbb"
| 1990-11-23 || Loss||align=left| Chuchai Kiatchaning || Lumpinee Stadium || Bangkok, Thailand || Decision || 5 ||3:00 
|- bgcolor="#cfc"
| 1990-11-06 || Win||align=left| Denthaksin Sor.Suwanpakdee || Lumpinee Stadium || Bangkok, Thailand || Decision || 5 ||3:00 
|- style="background:#fbb;"
| 1990-08-28 || Loss ||align=left| Saenklai Sit Kru Od || Lumpinee Stadium ||  Bangkok, Thailand  || Decision || 5 || 3:00
|- bgcolor=""
| 1990-06-26 || ||align=left| Sornsuriya Sor.Singsuriya || Lumpinee Stadium || Bangkok, Thailand || ||  || 
|- bgcolor="#cfc"
| 1990-05-11 || Win||align=left| Bebi Chor Jinsakul || Lumpinee Stadium || Bangkok, Thailand || Decision || 5 ||3:00 
|- bgcolor="#cfc"
| 1989-07-22 || Win||align=left| Hongthong Phetsriracha ||  || Chonburi, Thailand || Decision || 5 ||3:00
|- bgcolor="#fbb"
| 1989-01-03 || Loss||align=left| Hongthong Phetsriracha || Lumpinee Stadium || Bangkok, Thailand || Decision || 5 ||3:00 
|-
| colspan=9 | Legend:

Submission grappling record

References

External links

Living people
1974 births
Flyweight kickboxers
Rambaa Somdet
Muay Thai trainers
Strawweight mixed martial artists
Flyweight mixed martial artists
Mixed martial artists utilizing Muay Thai
Rambaa Somdet
Thai expatriates in Japan
Rambaa Somdet